Benjamin Franklin College is a residential college for undergraduates of Yale College in New Haven, Connecticut. It opened to students for the 2017 academic year.

History 

In 2008, Yale University President Rick Levin announced that the college had the resources to educate more students and thus would expand its enrollment by opening two new residential colleges for a total of fourteen. Architectural models were unveiled by Robert A.M. Stern Architects in May 2009, featuring "a sampling of Gothic styles from across Yale’s campus," notably inspired by the early 20th-century buildings of James Gamble Rogers. Construction began in the fall of 2014, with an official groundbreaking ceremony in April 2015. 

In April 2016, the university announced that the colleges would be named after Pauli Murray and Benjamin Franklin. Franklin was chosen at the behest of Charles B. Johnson, class of 1954, who had made the single largest gift in Yale's history of $250 million to support construction of the new colleges. Johnson is the co-founder and former Chairman and CEO of Franklin Templeton Investments, a global investment firm named after Franklin. Johnson reportedly did not mandate that Yale use the name as a condition of the donation, but requested its consideration. 

The naming decision was controversial, and was met with an outcry by Yale students and faculty. During the years of planning leading up to the construction of the two new colleges, the Yale administration had promised that the naming of the colleges was "not for sale" and that "neither of the two new residential colleges would be named for living donors". The Yale Daily News subsequently reported that the Yale administration had misled the Yale community, as the administration had appeared to solicit input on the naming of both colleges via public forums, debates, and online surveys over the course of several years leading up to the official announcement of the new colleges' names in 2016; following the announcement, however, it was revealed that the administration had agreed to fulfill Johnson's request to name one of the colleges after Benjamin Franklin shortly after his donation in 2013. Observers noted that giving the college the same name as the for-profit company founded by the donor, per the request of the donor, seemed to adhere to the letter but not the spirit of the earlier promise not to name the new colleges after living donors – especially given that unlike the namesakes of the other thirteen residential colleges, Benjamin Franklin had "little academic, administrative, financial or geographic connection to the University" other than an honorary degree given to him in 1753. Additionally, some commenters noted the irony of naming one of the two new colleges after Pauli Murray, the granddaughter of a slave, and the other after Franklin, who was a slaveowner (though he adopted abolitionist views later in his life, became the President of the Pennsylvania Society for the Abolition of Slavery, and petitioned the new United States Congress to end the slave trade.

Benjamin Franklin College is the southernmost of the two new colleges, referred to as "South College" in some earlier documents. Upon their opening to students for the 2017 academic year, the two colleges increased Yale's undergraduate capacity by 15 percent from 5,400 to 6,200 seats.

Charles Bailyn, A. Bartlett Giamatti Professor of Astronomy and Physics, is the first head of Benjamin Franklin College, and Jessie Hill, the former dean of Silliman College, is its first dean.

References

External links 

 

Residential colleges of Yale University
Robert A. M. Stern buildings